Compton is a municipality in Coaticook Regional County Municipality in the Estrie region  of Quebec, Canada.

Demographics

Population
Population trend:

(+) adjusted figures due to boundary changes

Elected representatives
Fernand Veilleux, mayor

Notable people
Louis Saint-Laurent (1882–1973), Prime Minister of Canada
Bernard St-Laurent, CBC Radio personality
Maryse Dubuc, creator of The Bellybuttons
William H. Bringloe, Canadian Hall of Fame and North American Champion racehorse trainer

References

External links

Compton, official site
Les Comptonales
Tourisme Coaticook
ESTRIEPLUS.COM What's happening in Estrie

Municipalities in Quebec
Incorporated places in Estrie
Coaticook Regional County Municipality